

Date
Dates are usually written in "day month year" (DMY) order. This order is used in both the all-numeric date (for example "") and the expanded form (for example ""; the trailing "р." is short for "рік" ("year"). Single-digit numbers for day or month may have a preceding zero (for example "") is more usual.

When saying the date, it is usually pronounced using the ordinal number of the day first, then the month (for example "").

Monday is the first day of the week.

Time
The 24-hour notation almost exclusively, with a colon as the standardised and recommended separator (e.g. 18:56). In spoken or informal Ukrainian, 12-hour notation can be used, but is not as recommended, but in this case in general, no am/pm specification is used, so this information is expected to be gained from context. Another difference from English is that half-hours are counted up to next hour: , literally  “half of the eighth” means 7:30, not 8:30.

References

Time in Ukraine
Ukraine

Date And Time Notation In Ukraine